The Islamic City Council of Mashhad is the directly elected council that presides over the city of Mashhad and elects the mayor in a mayor–council government system.

Members

References

External links
 

Mashhad
Mashhad
1999 establishments in Iran